is a place located in Chūō, Tokyo, Japan, in the Sumida River estuary. It is a reclaimed land next to Tsukuda District. The land reclamation completed in 1892, using earth from the dredging work performed to create a shipping channel in Tokyo Bay. At this time, it was designated as industrial area in accordance with the Fukoku Kyōhei National Policy.

Originally, Tsukuda Island was a tiny island at the river mouth. It was inhabited by a fishing community who migrated from Osaka in early 1600s. The original Tsukuda island now is home to the exclusive tower mansion & park complex Rivercity 21.

It has been said that the name (literally "moon island") was originally written using the characters 築島 which can also be read "Tsukishima" but mean "constructed island".

It is currently known for its large number of restaurants serving the local specialty, monjayaki.

Tsukishima Station is served by the Tokyo Metro Yūrakuchō Line and the Toei Subway Ōedo Line.

Education
Public elementary and junior high schools are operated by Chuo City Board of Education.

Zoned elementary schools include:
Tsukudajima Elementary School (佃島小学校)'s boundary includes portions of 1-chome
Tsukishima Daiichi (Tsukishima No. 1) Elementary School (月島第一小学校)'s boundary includes all of 3-chome and portions of 1, 2, and 4-chome
Tsukishima Daisan (Tsukishima No. 3) Elementary School (月島第三小学校)'s boundary includes portions of 2 and 4-chome

Zoned junior high schools include:
Tsukuda Junior High School (佃中学校)'s boundary includes all of 1 and 3-chome and portions of 2 and 4-chome
Harumi Junior High School (晴海中学校)'s boundary includes portions of 2 and 4-chome

Notable Residents

Masami Kurumada

References

Artificial islands of Tokyo
Districts of Chūō, Tokyo
Islands of Tokyo